The 2000 SEAT Open was a women's tennis tournament played on indoor carpet courts in Kockelscheuer, Luxembourg which was part of Tier III of the 2000 WTA Tour. It was the 5th edition of the tournament and was held from 25 September until 1 October 2000. Third-seeded Jennifer Capriati won the singles title and earned $27,000 first-prize money.

Finals

Singles
 Jennifer Capriati defeated  Magdalena Maleeva, 4–6, 6–1, 6–4
 This was Capriati's first singles title of the year and the 9th of her career.

Doubles
 Alexandra Fusai /  Nathalie Tauziat defeated  Lubomira Bacheva /  Cristina Torrens Valero, 6–3, 7–6(7–0)

References

External links
 ITF tournament edition details
 Tournament draws

SEAT Luxembourg Open
Luxembourg Open
2000 in Luxembourgian tennis